This is a list of Indian Test cricketers. A Test match is an international cricket match between two of the leading cricketing nations. The list is arranged in the order in which each player won his Test cap. Where more than one player won his first Test cap in the same Test match, those players are listed alphabetically by surname.

Players
Statistics are correct as of 13 March 2023.

Captains

Statistics are correct as of 13 March 2023.

Shirt number history
Since the 2019 Ashes series, there has been an introduction of names and numbers on all Test players' shirts in an effort to engage new fans and help identify the players. This forms part of the inaugural ICC World Test Championship, a league competition between the top nine Test nations spread over a two-year period, culminating in a Final between the top two teams.

Notes

References

External links

 ESPNcricinfo
 Howstat

India Test
India